Concordia Preparatory School (CPS) is a co-educational parochial secondary school serving grades 6-12. Originally known as Baltimore Lutheran School, the school is located in Towson, Maryland, United States. CPS is operated by the Baltimore Lutheran High School Association, Inc., an association of Lutheran churches in the Baltimore area.

Religious background
Concordia Preparatory School is affiliated with the Lutheran Church–Missouri Synod (LCMS). A majority of the faculty and staff are members of the LCMS. Chapel and religion classes are taught from a Lutheran Christian point of view. However, Concordia Prep accepts students from a wide variety of Christian faith backgrounds.

History
Land for the school's campus was purchased in 1951, and the school opened in 1965 as Baltimore Lutheran School. In 2014, the name was changed to Concordia Preparatory School as part of an effort to increase its visibility and enrollment.

Curriculum
Concordia Preparatory School offers a Christian college preparatory curriculum.

Campus
The campus sits on  situated in a residential area next to the Baltimore Beltway (I-695). There are two classroom buildings, and an activity center which contains the gymnasium, cafeteria, and band room.

There are two athletic fields. The lower field was replaced with Sportexe synthetic turf in the summer of 2005, and is used for soccer, football, lacrosse, and baseball. The upper field is natural grass and is used for field hockey and softball. A Field House was completed in the summer of 2007 which was used as a practice facility for several sports. The field house collapsed due to snow accumulation on its roof in 2016.

Sports
Concordia Prep's sports teams compete in the MIAA and the IAAM, private school leagues in northern Maryland. Both girls' and boys' teams are referred to as the Saints.

Fall sports: boys' football (varsity),boys' soccer (varsity, junior varsity, middle school), girls' soccer (varsity, middle school), girls' volleyball (varsity, junior varsity), girls' field hockey (varsity, junior varsity), boys' cross country (varsity, middle school), girls' cross country (varsity, middle school), girls' tennis (varsity), cheerleading (middle school, junior varsity, and varsity).

Winter sports: boys' basketball (varsity, junior varsity, middle school), girls' basketball (varsity, junior varsity, middle school), boys' wrestling (varsity, middle school), girls' indoor soccer (varsity), cheerleading (middle school, junior varsity, and varsity).

Spring sports: boys' baseball (varsity, middle school), girls' softball (varsity, middle school), boys' track (varsity, middle school), girls' track (varsity, middle school), boys' lacrosse (varsity), girls' lacrosse (varsity), boys' tennis (varsity).

CPS teams have won several recent conference championships including: girls' track, girls' lacrosse, boys' soccer, girls' basketball, girls' indoor soccer, football, and baseball. The boys' varsity lacrosse team has also won three consecutive championship titles (2009-2011). The girls' varsity lacrosse team won the 2011 IAAM lacrosse championship. In 2018 and 2019, the boys’ soccer team won the B-Conference Championship. They have also won the 2021 football B championship MIAA.

Notable alumni
Brandon Hardesty - movie/TV actor, gained fame through YouTube

See also
 Harford Lutheran School

References

External links
Concordia Prep home page
News article from Towson Times about Lutheran students' participation in Hurricane Katrina relief

Private high schools in Maryland
Private schools in Baltimore County, Maryland
Secondary schools affiliated with the Lutheran Church–Missouri Synod
Private middle schools in Maryland
Towson, Maryland
Lutheran schools in Maryland